The A31 autoroute, also known as l'Autoroute de Lorraine-Bourgogne, is a French motorway. The road runs from the Franco-Luxembourg border to Beaune where it joins the A6. The northern part of the autoroute is free, as far as the town of Toul, but is a toll road south of there. The autoroute serves the cities of Metz, Nancy, and Dijon and is heavily used in the holiday season as it is a convenient route for those travelling from Belgium, the Netherlands, Luxembourg, and Germany to the south of France.

Junctions

Future
There is a proposal to create a new autoroute, the A32, to relieve congestion on the A31 but the scheme is currently stalled owing to vigorous opposition.

External links
A31 autoroute in Saratlas

A31